WJZD-FM (94.5 MHz), known as "JZ 94.5", is a radio station on the MS Gulf Coast and licensed to Long Beach, Mississippi, with an urban contemporary format. It is the heritage station owned by WJZD, Inc. and is the only minority-owned FM station in the Biloxi-Gulfport-Pascagoula, Mississippi market.

External links
WJZD official website

JZD-FM
Urban contemporary radio stations in the United States
Radio stations established in 1992